The Adams County Courthouse is located at 110 West Main Street in West Union, Ohio, United States.

History
Adams County was formed in 1797 as the fourth county of the Northwest Territory which would soon form the state of Ohio. The first county seat was in Manchester but no courthouse was ever built at that location.  The first official county seat of the territory was Adamsville and the county officials met in various locations, as, like Manchester, no courthouse was constructed.

The Ohio General Assembly moved the county seat to West Union, the current county seat, and plans for a courthouse were drafted. This first courthouse was a simple log structure of oak, poplar, walnut and blue ash. The courthouse stood two stories high and had a footprint of 30 feet by 24 feet. This structure was replaced in 1811 by a stone and brick building. This building also stood two stories high with a pitched roof resting on an unadorned entablature. A cupola rose from the roof line and could be seen around the town. The building remained until 1876 when a new courthouse was constructed. It was around this time that Manchester unsuccessfully petitioned to be named the county seat.

The present courthouse replaced the courthouse of 1876 after a fire wiped out the structure and all of the court records. Constructed from 1910 to 1911 by architect T.S. Murray, the building was built from a bond passed that raised $50,000.

Exterior
The building was built with yellow bricks with unadorned rectangular windows. The entrances were lined with red brick pilasters supporting a pediment roof. The roof was flat with a balustrade. A rectangular tower rises from the center of the building and is crowned with four arches supporting a dome. The dome is relatively unadorned and houses a four-faced clock.

Renovation in 1975 saw a northern addition containing a courtroom, jail, office space, and the county sheriff's living quarters (which was formally retired in the late 1990s). The front portico was also added and includes four bottom pilasters supporting a balcony, with four pilasters supporting the pediment above.

Interior
The main entrance contains a unique decoration, a mounted head of the white-tailed deer commonly found throughout Ohio. The 27-point buck was found frozen in a creek by local boys Steven & Donnie Swayne and Tommy Dryden, who then carried the head of the deer back to town. The find caused much debate, as the wildlife officer for Adams County claimed the buck was found dead and did not belong to anyone. After much debate and petitions, the head made its way to the courthouse in 1976 and has been proudly displayed in the courthouse ever since.

Gallery

References

Further reading
Thrane, Susan W.; County Courthouses of Ohio, Indiana University Press; Indianapolis, Indiana 2000 
Marzulli, Lawrence J.; The Development of Ohio's Counties and Their Historic Courthouses; Gray Printing Company; Fostoria, Ohio 1983
Stebbins, Clair; Ohio's Court Houses; Ohio State Bar Association; Columbus, Ohio 1980

External links
Description of courthouse
Picture of courthouse before portico addition circa 1930

Buildings and structures in Adams County, Ohio
County courthouses in Ohio
Georgian architecture in Ohio
Government buildings completed in 1911
Clock towers in Ohio
1911 establishments in Ohio